The 1975–76 Denver Spurs/Ottawa Civics season was the ill-fated single season of operation of the Denver Spurs/Ottawa Civics in the World Hockey Association (WHA). The Spurs began the season in Denver, Colorado but relocated to Ottawa, Ontario before giving up for good after 41 games.

Offseason

Regular season

Final standings

Denver Spurs Game log

Ottawa Civics Game log

Playoffs

Player stats

Note: Pos = Position; GP = Games played; G = Goals; A = Assists; Pts = Points; +/- = plus/minus; PIM = Penalty minutes; PPG = Power-play goals; SHG = Short-handed goals; GWG = Game-winning goals
      MIN = Minutes played; W = Wins; L = Losses; T = Ties; GA = Goals-against; GAA = Goals-against average; SO = Shutouts;

Awards and records

Transactions

Draft picks
Denver's draft picks at the 1975 WHA Amateur Draft.

Farm teams

See also
1975–76 WHA season

References

External links

Ott
Den
Den